Back Then is a 1943 German drama film directed by Rolf Hansen and starring Zarah Leander, Hans Stüwe, and Rossano Brazzi. The film's sets were designed by Walter Haag.
It was made at the Babelsberg Studio, by Universum Film AG, Germany's largest film company. It was Leander's final film of the Nazi era, as she returned to Sweden shortly afterwards. This was a blow for the German film industry, as she was the most popular and highest-paid star. Leander's next film was not for another seven years, when she made a comeback in Gabriela (1950).

Cast

References

Bibliography

External links 
 

1943 films
Films of Nazi Germany
German drama films
1943 drama films
1940s German-language films
Films directed by Rolf Hansen
UFA GmbH films
German black-and-white films
Films scored by Ralph Benatzky
1940s German films